Civil Aviation Training Institute (CATI) is located in Hyderabad, Sindh, Pakistan.
The Civil Aviation Training Institute is a highly advanced Airport Operation maintenance facility. Hyderabad city is the centre of the famous Indus Valley civilization. It provides its students an educational environment unmatched in the region. It is approximately 180 km east of Karachi and is linked by a modern highway, a railroad and regular air service.

History
Civil Aviation Training Institute was established in 1982 under the aegis of International Civil Aviation Organization (ICAO) and United Nations Development Programme (UNDP)

Disciplines
Civil Aviation Training Institute (CATI) provides training  in the disciplines of :
Air Traffic Services
Electronics Engineering
Communication Operations
Aviation Management & Administration
Rescue and Fire Fighting Services
Electromechanical Engineering

See also 
 Civil Aviation Authority
 Airlines of Pakistan
 Transport in Pakistan
 Mobile World Magazine

References

External links 
 Civil Aviation Training Institute
 Civil Aviation Training Institute

Aviation schools in Pakistan
Universities and colleges in Hyderabad District, Pakistan
Civil aviation in Pakistan